Jeremy Hardy Speaks to the Nation was a BBC Radio 4 series of comedy lectures hosted by Jeremy Hardy, first broadcast in September 1993. The tenth and final series aired in 2014.

The lectures were on topics like "How to have a baby", "How to be truly loved", and often included Hardy's personal views on current affairs.

There were a series of sketches and mock interviews carried out with his two guests.  Gordon Kennedy and Debbie Isitt were the two main guests, while other guests included Meera Syal, Rebecca Front, Alison Steadman, Stephen Frost, Miranda Richardson and Harriet Walter.

Episode guide

Audio Books
Jeremy Hardy Speaks to the Nation currently has four audio books on sale.

How To Be Happy and other shows - Released on 19 July 2004.
How To Be Young and other shows - Released on 19 July 2004.
How To Be Afraid and other shows - Released on 15 November 2004.
How To Live and other shows - Released on 15 November 2004.

In addition the first series was adapted as a book, published by Methuen in 1993.

Awards
The show was nominated in 2004 for the Sony Comedy award.

References

External links

BBC Radio comedy programmes
BBC Radio 4 programmes